This is a list of works by South Korean singer Sung Si-kyung.

Albums

Studio albums

Cover albums

Singles

Soundtrack appearances

Filmography

Television dramas

Host

Television  shows

Web shows

Talk Shows

Radio

Notes

References 

Discographies of South Korean artists
Hip hop discographies
Pop music discographies